The rodent subfamily Sigmodontinae includes New World rats and mice, with at least 376 species. Many authorities include the Neotominae and Tylomyinae as part of a larger definition of Sigmodontinae.  When those genera are included, the species count numbers at least 508. Their distribution includes much of the New World, but the genera are predominantly South American, such as brucies. They invaded South America from Central America as part of the Great American Interchange near the end of the Miocene, about 5 million years ago. Sigmodontines proceeded to diversify explosively in the formerly isolated continent. They inhabit many of the same ecological niches that the Murinae occupy in the Old World.

The "Thomasomyini" from the Atlantic Forest of Brazil are generally thought to be not especially related to the "real" Thomasomyini from the northern Andes and the Amazon rainforest. The genera Wiedomys and Sigmodon are generally placed in their own tribe, and the "phyllotines" Irenomys, Punomys, Euneomys, and Reithrodon are considered incertae sedis.

The name "Sigmodontinae" is based on the name of the type genus, Sigmodon. This name in turn derives from the Greek roots for "S-tooth" (- for "S" and odont- for "tooth", as in orthodontist) for the characteristic of the molars having an S-shape when viewed from above.

Species
The Sigmodontinae are divided into a number of tribes and genera:

Sigmodontalia
Tribe Sigmodontini
Genus Prosigmodon
 Prosigmodon chihuahuensis
 Prosigmodon ferrusquiai
 Prosigmodon holocuspis
 Prosigmodon oroscoi
 Prosigmodon tecolotum
Genus Sigmodon - cotton rats
Subgenus Sigmodon 
Sigmodon hispidus species group 
Allen's cotton rat, Sigmodon alleni
Arizona cotton rat, Sigmodon arizonae
Southern cotton rat, Sigmodon hirsutus
Hispid cotton rat, Sigmodon hispidus
Jaliscan cotton rat, Sigmodon mascotensis
Yellow-nosed cotton rat, Sigmodon ochrognathus
Miahuatlán cotton rat, Sigmodon planifrons
Toltec cotton rat, Sigmodon toltecus
Montane cotton rat, Sigmodon zanjonensis
Sigmodon fulviventer species group 
Tawny-bellied cotton rat, Sigmodon fulviventer
Unexpected cotton rat, Sigmodon inopinatus
White-eared cotton rat, Sigmodon leucotis
Peruvian cotton rat, Sigmodon peruanus
Subgenus Sigmomys 
Alston's cotton rat, Sigmodon alstoni
Tribe Ichthyomyini - fish- and crab-eating rats & water mice
Genus Anotomys - Ecuadorian fish-eating rat
Aquatic rat, Anotomys leander
Genus Chibchanomys - water mice
Las Cajas water mouse, Chibchanomys orcesi
Chibchan water mouse, Chibchanomys trichotis
Genus Ichthyomys - crab-eating rats
Crab-eating rat, Ichthyomys hydrobates
Pittier's crab-eating rat, Ichthyomys pittieri
Stolzmann's crab-eating rat, Ichthyomys stolzmanni
Tweedy's crab-eating rat, Ichthyomys tweedii
Genus Neusticomys - fish-eating rats
Ferreira's fish-eating rat, Neusticomys ferreirai
Montane fish-eating rat, Neusticomys monticolus
Musso's fish-eating rat, Neusticomys mussoi
Oyapock's fish-eating rat, Neusticomys oyapocki
Peruvian fish-eating rat, Neusticomys peruviensis
Venezuelan fish-eating rat, Neusticomys venezuelae
Genus Rheomys - water mice
Mexican water mouse, Rheomys mexicanus
Goldman's water mouse, Rheomys raptor
Thomas's water mouse, Rheomys thomasi
Underwood's water mouse, Rheomys underwoodi
Oryzomyalia
Tribe Oryzomyini - rice rats, marsh rats, bristly mice, cane mice
Genus Aegialomys
Galápagos rice rat, Aegialomys galapagoensis
Yellowish rice rat, Aegialomys xanthaeolus
Genus Amphinectomys - Ucayali water rat
Ucayali water rat, Amphinectomys savamis
Genus Cerradomys
Cerradomys langguthi
Cerradomys maracajuensis
Cerradomys marinhus
Lindbergh’s oryzomys, Cerradomys scotti (including Oryzomys andersoni)
Terraced rice rat, Cerradomys subflavus
Cerradomys vivoi
Genus Drymoreomys
Drymoreomys albimaculatus
Genus Eremoryzomys
Grey rice rat, Eremoryzomys polius
Genus Euryoryzomys
Emmons's rice rat, Euryoryzomys emmonsae
Monster rice rat, Euryoryzomys lamia
Big-headed rice rat, Euryoryzomys legatus
MacConnell's rice rat, Euryoryzomys macconnelli
Elegant rice rat, Euryoryzomys nitidus
Russet rice rat, Euryoryzomys russatus
Genus Handleyomys 
Alfaro's rice rat, Handleyomys alfaroi
Chapman's rice rat, Handleyomys chapmani
Dusky-footed Handley's mouse, Handleyomys fuscatus
Colombian rice rat, Handleyomys intectus
Black-eared rice rat, Handleyomys melanotis
Striped rice rat, Handleyomys rhabdops
Long-nosed rice rat, Handleyomys rostratus
Cloud forest rice rat, Handleyomys saturatior
Genus Holochilus - marsh rats
Web-footed marsh rat, Holochilus brasiliensis
Chaco marsh rat, Holochilus chacarius
Amazonian marsh rat (or common marsh rat), Holochilus sciureus
Genus Hylaeamys
Hylaeamys acritus
Hylaeamys laticeps
Large-headed rice rat, Hylaeamys megacephalus
Sowbug rice rat, Hylaeamys oniscus
Hylaeamys perenensis
Tate's rice rat, Hylaeamys tatei
Yungas rice rat, Hylaeamys yunganus
Genus Lundomys - Lund's amphibious rat
Lund's amphibious rat, Lundomys molitor
Genus Megalomys † - giant rice rats
Barbuda giant rice-rat, Megalomys audreyae †
Megalomys curazensis †
Antillean giant rice rat, Megalomys desmarestii †
Santa Lucian pilorie, Megalomys luciae †
Genus Melanomys - dark rice rats
Dusky rice rat, Melanomys caliginosus
Robust dark rice rat, Melanomys robustulus
Zuniga's dark rice rat, Melanomys zunigae
Genus Microakodontomys - Brasilia's mouse
Transitional colilargo, Microakodontomys transitorius
Genus Microryzomys - small rice rats
Highland small rice rat, Microryzomys altissimus
Forest small rice rat, Microryzomys minutus
Genus Mindomys
Hammond's rice rat, Mindomys hammondi
Genus Neacomys - bristly mice
Dubost's bristly mouse, Neacomys dubosti
Guiana bristly mouse, Neacomys guianae
Small bristly mouse, Neacomys minutus
Musser's bristly mouse, Neacomys musseri
Paracou bristly mouse, Neacomys paracou
Painted bristly mouse, Neacomys pictus
Common bristly mouse, Neacomys spinosus
Narrow-footed bristly mouse, Neacomys tenuipes
Genus Nectomys - water rats
Western Amazonian nectomys, Nectomys apicalis
Magdalena nectomys, Nectomys magdalenae
Trinidad water rat, Nectomys palmipes
Amazonian nectomys, Nectomys rattus
South American water rat, Nectomys squamipes
Genus Nephelomys
Tomes's rice rat, Nephelomys albigularis
Ecuadorian rice rat, Nephelomys auriventer
Caracol rice rat, Nephelomys caracolus
Nephelomys childi
Boquete rice rat, Nephelomys devius
Keays's rice rat, Nephelomys keaysi
Light-footed rice rat, Nephelomys levipes
Nephelomys meridensis
Nephelomys moerex
Nephelomys nimbosus
Nephelomys pectoralis
Mount Pirre rice rat, Nephelomys pirrensis
Genus Nesoryzomys - Galapagos mice
Darwin's Galápagos mouse, Nesoryzomys darwini †
Fernandina rice rat, Nesoryzomys fernandinae
Indefatigable Galápagos mouse, Nesoryzomys indefessus
Santiago Galápagos mouse, Nesoryzomys swarthi
Genus Noronhomys - Vespucci's rodent †
Vespucci's rodent, Noronhomys vespuccii †
Genus Oecomys - Arboreal rice rats
North Amazonian arboreal rice rat, Oecomys auyantepui
Bicolored arboreal rice rat, Oecomys bicolor
Atlantic Forest oecomys, Oecomys catherinae
Cleber's arboreal rice rat, Oecomys cleberi
Unicolored rice rat, Oecomys concolor
Yellow arboreal rice rat, Oecomys flavicans
Mamore arboreal rice rat, Oecomys mamorae
Brazilian arboreal rice rat, Oecomys paricola
Dusky arboreal rice rat, Oecomys phaeotis
King arboreal rice rat, Oecomys rex
Robert's arboreal rice rat, Oecomys roberti
Red arboreal rice rat, Oecomys rutilus
Arboreal rice rat, Oecomys speciosus
Foothill arboreal rice rat, Oecomys superans
Oecomys sydandersoni
Long-furred rice rat, Oecomys trinitatis
Genus Oligoryzomys - pygmy rice rats
Andean pygmy rice rat, Oligoryzomys andinus
Sandy pygmy rice rat, Oligoryzomys arenalis
Brenda's colilargo, Oligoryzomys brendae
Chacoan pygmy rice rat, Oligoryzomys chacoensis
Destructive pygmy rice rat, Oligoryzomys destructor
Yellow pygmy rice rat, Oligoryzomys flavescens
Fornes' colilargo, Oligoryzomys fornesi
Fulvous pygmy rice rat, Oligoryzomys fulvescens
Grayish pygmy rice rat, Oligoryzomys griseolus
Long-tailed pygmy rice rat, Oligoryzomys longicaudatus
Magellanic pygmy rice rat, Oligoryzomys magellanicus
Small-eared pygmy rice rat, Oligoryzomys microtis
Oligoryzomys moojeni
Black-footed pygmy rice rat, Oligoryzomys nigripes
Oligoryzomys rupestris
Straw-colored pygmy rice rat, Oligoryzomys stramineus
Sprightly pygmy rice rat, Oligoryzomys vegetus
St. Vincent pygmy rice rat, Oligoryzomys victus †
Genus Oreoryzomys
Oreoryzomys balneator
Genus Oryzomys - rice rats
Oryzomys albiventer
Jamaican rice rat, Oryzomys antillarum †
Coues' rice rat, Oryzomys couesi
Thomas's rice rat, Oryzomys dimidiatus
Gorgas's rice rat, Oryzomys gorgasi
Oryzomys nelsoni †
Marsh rice rat, Oryzomys palustris
Lower California rice rat, Oryzomys peninsulae ?†
Genus Pseudoryzomys - false rice rats
Brazilian false rice rat, Pseudoryzomys simplex
Genus Scolomys- New World spiny mice
South American spiny mouse, Scolomys melanops
Ucayali spiny mouse, Scolomys ucayalensis
Genus Sigmodontomys - rice water rats
Alfaro's rice water rat, Sigmodontomys alfari
Genus Sooretamys
Rat-headed rice rat, Sooretamys angouya
Genus Tanyuromys
Harris's rice water rat, Tanyuromys aphrastus
Lee's long-tailed montane rat, Tanyuromys thomasleei
Genus Transandinomys
Long-whiskered rice rat, Transandinomys bolivaris
Transandinomys talamancae
Genus Zygodontomys - cane mice
Short-tailed cane mouse, Zygodontomys brevicauda
Colombian cane mouse, Zygodontomys brunneus
Tribe Thomasomyini
Genus Abrawayaomys - Ruschi's rat
Ruschi's rat, Abrawayaomys ruschii
Genus Aepeomys - montane mice
Olive montane mouse, Aepeomys lugens
Reig's montane mouse, Aepeomys reigi
Genus Chilomys - Columbian forest mouse
Colombian forest mouse, Chilomys instans
Genus Delomys - Atlantic Forest rats
Montane Atlantic Forest rat, Delomys collinus
Striped Atlantic Forest rat, Delomys dorsalis
Pallid Atlantic Forest rat, Delomys sublineatus
Genus Phaenomys - Rio de Janeiro arboreal rat
Rio de Janeiro arboreal rat, Phaenomys ferrugineus
Genus Rhagomys - arboreal mice
Long-tongued arboreal mouse, Rhagomys longilingua
Brazilian arboreal mouse, Rhagomys rufescens
Genus Rhipidomys - climbing mice
Southern climbing mouse, Rhipidomys austrinus
Cariri climbing mouse, Rhipidomys cariri
Cauca climbing mouse, Rhipidomys caucensis
Coues's climbing mouse, Rhipidomys couesi
Eastern Amazon climbing mouse, Rhipidomys emiliae
Buff-bellied climbing mouse, Rhipidomys fulviventer
Gardner's climbing mouse, Rhipidomys gardneri
Broad-footed climbing mouse, Rhipidomys latimanus
White-footed climbing mouse, Rhipidomys leucodactylus
MacConnell's climbing mouse, Rhipidomys macconnelli
Cerrado climbing mouse, Rhipidomys macrurus
Atlantic Forest climbing mouse, Rhipidomys mastacalis
Peruvian climbing mouse, Rhipidomys modicus
Splendid climbing mouse, Rhipidomys nitela
Yellow-bellied climbing mouse, Rhipidomys ochrogaster
Venezuelan climbing mouse, Rhipidomys venezuelae
Charming climbing mouse, Rhipidomys venustus
Wetzel's climbing mouse, Rhipidomys wetzeli
Genus Thomasomys - Oldfield mice
Anderson's Oldfield mouse, Thomasomys andersoni
Apeco Oldfield mouse, Thomasomys apeco
Golden Oldfield mouse, Thomasomys aureus
Beady-eyed mouse, Thomasomys baeops
Silky Oldfield mouse, Thomasomys bombycinus
White-tipped Oldfield mouse, Thomasomys caudivarius
Ashy-bellied Oldfield mouse, Thomasomys cinereiventer
Ash-colored Oldfield mouse, Thomasomys cinereus
Cinnamon-colored Oldfield mouse, Thomasomys cinnameus
Daphne's Oldfield mouse, Thomasomys daphne
Peruvian Oldfield mouse, Thomasomys eleusis
Wandering Oldfield mouse, Thomasomys erro
Slender Oldfield mouse, Thomasomys gracilis
Hudson's Oldfield mouse, Thomasomys hudsoni
Woodland Oldfield mouse, Thomasomys hylophilus
Inca Oldfield mouse, Thomasomys incanus
Strong-tailed Oldfield mouse, Thomasomys ischyrus
Kalinowski's Oldfield mouse, Thomasomys kalinowskii
Ladew's Oldfield mouse, Thomasomys ladewi
Soft-furred Oldfield mouse, Thomasomys laniger**
Large-eared Oldfield mouse, Thomasomys macrotis
Unicolored Oldfield mouse, Thomasomys monochromos
Snow-footed Oldfield mouse, Thomasomys niveipes
Distinguished Oldfield mouse, Thomasomys notatus
Ashaninka Oldfield mouse, Thomasomys onkiro
Montane Oldfield mouse, Thomasomys oreas
Paramo Oldfield mouse, Thomasomys paramorum
Popayán Oldfield mouse, Thomasomys popayanus
Cajamarca Oldfield mouse, Thomasomys praetor
Thomas's Oldfield mouse, Thomasomys pyrrhonotus
Rhoads's Oldfield mouse, Thomasomys rhoadsi
Rosalinda's Oldfield mouse, Thomasomys rosalinda
Forest Oldfield mouse, Thomasomys silvestris
Taczanowski's Oldfield mouse, Thomasomys taczanowskii
Ucucha Oldfield mouse, Thomasomys ucucha
Dressy Oldfield mouse, Thomasomys vestitus
Pichincha Oldfield mouse, Thomasomys vulcani
Genus Wilfredomys - Wilfred's mice
Greater Wilfred's mouse, Wilfredomys oenax
Tribe Wiedomyini
Genus Cholomys †
Cholomys pearsoni †
Genus Wiedomys - red-nosed mouse
Cerrado red-nosed mouse, Wiedomys cerradensis
Red-nosed mouse, Wiedomys pyrrhorhinos
Tribe Abrotrichini
Genus Abrothrix
Andean altiplano mouse, Abrothrix andinus
Hershkovitz's grass mouse, Abrothrix hershkovitzi
Gray grass mouse, Abrothrix illuteus
Jelski's altiplano mouse, Abrothrix jelskii
Woolly grass mouse, Abrothrix lanosus
Long-haired grass mouse, Abrothrix longipilis
Olive grass mouse, Abrothrix olivaceus
Sanborn's grass mouse, Abrothrix sanborni
Genus Chelemys - long-clawed mice
Magellanic long-clawed akodont, Chelemys delfini
Andean long-clawed mouse, Chelemys macronyx
Large long-clawed mouse, Chelemys megalonyx
Genus Geoxus - long-clawed mole mouse
Long-clawed mole mouse, Geoxus valdivianus
Pearson's long-clawed mouse, Geoxus annectens
Genus Notiomys - Edward's long-clawed mouse
Edwards's long-clawed mouse, Notiomys edwardsii
Tribe Akodontini
Genus Akodon - South American grass mice
Highland grass mouse, Akodon aerosus
Colombian grass mouse, Akodon affinis
White-bellied grass mouse, Akodon albiventer
Azara's grass mouse, Akodon azarae
Bolivian grass mouse, Akodon boliviensis
Budin's grass mouse, Akodon budini
Akodon caenosus
Cursor grass mouse, Akodon cursor
Day's grass mouse, Akodon dayi
Dolorous grass mouse, Akodon dolores
Smoky grass mouse, Akodon fumeus
Akodon glaucinus
Intelligent grass mouse, Akodon iniscatus
Junín grass mouse, Akodon juninensis
Koford's grass mouse, Akodon kofordi
Lindbergh's grass mouse, Akodon lindberghi
Altiplano grass mouse, Akodon lutescens
Thespian grass mouse, Akodon mimus
Molina's grass mouse, Akodon molinae
Soft grass mouse, Akodon mollis
Montane grass mouse, Akodon montensis
Caparaó grass mouse, Akodon mystax
Neuquén grass mouse, Akodon neocenus
El Dorado grass mouse, Akodon orophilus
Paraná grass mouse, Akodon paranaensis
Tarija akodont, Akodon pervalens
Philip Myers's akodont, Akodon philipmyersi
Akodon polopi
Reig's grass mouse, Akodon reigi
São Paulo grass mouse, Akodon sanctipaulensis
Serra do Mar grass mouse, Akodon serrensis
Cochabamba grass mouse, Akodon siberiae
White-throated grass mouse, Akodon simulator
Spegazzini's grass mouse, Akodon spegazzinii
Puno grass mouse, Akodon subfuscus
Silent grass mouse, Akodon surdus
Forest grass mouse, Akodon sylvanus
Akodon tartareus
Chaco grass mouse, Akodon toba
Cloud forest grass mouse, Akodon torques
Variable grass mouse, Akodon varius
Genus Neomicroxus 
Bogotá grass mouse, Neomicroxus bogotensis
Ecuadorian grass mouse, Neomicroxus latebricola
Genus Bibimys - crimson-nosed rats
Chaco crimson-nosed rat, Bibimys chacoensis
Large-lipped crimson-nosed rat, Bibimys labiosus
Torres's crimson-nosed rat, Bibimys torresi
Genus Blarinomys - Brazilian shrew-mouse
Brazilian shrew-mouse, Blarinomys breviceps
Genus Brucepattersonius
Grey-bellied brucie, Brucepattersonius griserufescens
Guaraní brucie, Brucepattersonius guarani
Red-bellied brucie, Brucepattersonius igniventris
Ihering's hocicudo, Brucepattersonius iheringi
Misiones brucie, Brucepattersonius misionensis
Arroyo of Paradise brucie, Brucepattersonius paradisus
Soricine brucie, Brucepattersonius soricinus
Genus Deltamys - Kemp's grass mouse
Kemp's grass mouse, Deltamys kempi
Genus Juscelinomys - burrowing mice
Candango mouse, Juscelinomys candango †
Rio Guaporé mouse, Juscelinomys guaporensis
Huanchaca mouse, Juscelinomys huanchacae
Genus Kunsia - giant rats
Fossorial giant rat, Kunsia fronto
Woolly giant rat, Kunsia tomentosus
Genus Lenoxus - Andean rat
Andean rat, Lenoxus apicalis
Genus Necromys - bolo mice
Pleasant bolo mouse, Necromys amoenus
Argentine bolo mouse, Necromys benefactus
Rufous-bellied bolo mouse, Necromys lactens
Hairy-tailed bolo mouse, Necromys lasiurus
Paraguayan bolo mouse, Necromys lenguarum
Dark bolo mouse, Necromys obscurus
Spotted bolo mouse, Necromys punctulatus
Temchuk's bolo mouse, Necromys temchuki
Northern grass mouse, Necromys urichi
Genus Oxymycterus - hocicudos
Argentine hocicudo, Oxymycterus akodontius
Amazon hocicudo, Oxymycterus amazonicus
Angular hocicudo, Oxymycterus angularis
Caparao hocicudo, Oxymycterus caparaoe
Atlantic Forest hocicudo, Oxymycterus dasytrichus
Spy hocicudo, Oxymycterus delator
Small hocicudo, Oxymycterus hiska
Hispid hocicudo, Oxymycterus hispidus
Quechuan hocicudo, Oxymycterus hucucha
Incan hocicudo, Oxymycterus inca
Cook's hocicudo, Oxymycterus josei
Long-nosed hocicudo, Oxymycterus nasutus
Paramo hocicudo, Oxymycterus paramensis
Quaestor hocicudo, Oxymycterus quaestor
Robert's hocicudo, Oxymycterus roberti
Red hocicudo, Oxymycterus rufus
Oxymycterus wayku
Genus Podoxymys - Roraima mouse
Roraima mouse, Podoxymys roraimae
Genus Scapteromys - swamp rat
Argentine swamp rat, Scapteromys aquaticus
Waterhouse's swamp rat, Scapteromys tumidus
Genus Thalpomys - cerrado mice
Cerrado mouse, Thalpomys cerradensis
Hairy-eared cerrado mouse, Thalpomys lasiotis
Genus Thaptomys - ebony akodont
Blackish grass mouse, Thaptomys nigrita
Tribe Phyllotini
Genus Andalgalomys - chaco mice
Olrog's chaco mouse, Andalgalomys olrogi
Pearson's chaco mouse, Andalgalomys pearsoni
Roig's chaco mouse, Andalgalomys roigi
Genus Andinomys - Andean mouse
Andean mouse, Andinomys edax
Genus Auliscomys - big-eared mice
Bolivian big-eared mouse, Auliscomys boliviensis
Painted big-eared mouse, Auliscomys pictus
Andean big-eared mouse, Auliscomys sublimis
Genus Calomys - vesper mice
Bolivian vesper mouse, Calomys boliviae
Crafty vesper mouse, Calomys callidus
Large vesper mouse, Calomys callosus
Calomys cerqueirai
Caatinga vesper mouse, Calomys expulsus
Fecund vesper mouse, Calomys fecundus
Hummelinck's vesper mouse, Calomys hummelincki
Small vesper mouse, Calomys laucha
Andean vesper mouse, Calomys lepidus
Drylands vesper mouse, Calomys musculinus
Peruvian vesper mouse, Calomys sorellus
Delicate vesper mouse, Calomys tener
Tocantins vesper mouse, Calomys tocantinsi
Córdoba vesper mouse, Calomys venustus
Genus Chinchillula - altiplano chinchilla mouse
Altiplano chinchilla mouse, Chinchillula sahamae
Genus Eligmodontia - silky desert mice
Monte gerbil mouse, Eligmodontia moreni
Andean gerbil mouse, Eligmodontia puerulus
Eligmodontia hirtipes (recently separated from Eligmodontia puerulus)
Morgan's gerbil mouse, Eligmodontia morgani
Eastern Patagonian laucha, Eligmodontia typus 
Highland gerbil mouse, Eligmodontia (typus) bolsonensis
Genus Euneomys - chinchilla mice
Patagonian chinchilla mouse, Euneomys chinchilloides
Burrowing chinchilla mouse, Euneomys fossor
Biting chinchilla mouse, Euneomys mordax
Peterson's chinchilla mouse, Euneomys petersoni
Genus Galenomys - Garlepp's mouse
Garlepp's mouse, Galenomys garleppi
Genus Graomys - leaf-eared mice
Central leaf-eared mouse, Graomys centralis
Pale leaf-eared mouse, Graomys domorum
Edith's leaf-eared mouse, Graomys edithae
Gray leaf-eared mouse, Graomys griseoflavus
Genus Ichthyurodon †
Ichthyurodon ameghinoi †
Genus Irenomys - Chilean climbing mouse
Chilean climbing mouse, Irenomys tarsalis
Genus Loxodontomys
Southern big-eared mouse, Loxodontomys micropus
Pikumche pericote, Loxodontomys pikumche
Genus Neotomys - Andean swamp rat
Andean swamp rat, Neotomys ebriosus
Genus Olympicomys †
Olympicomys vossi †
Genus Phyllotis - leaf-eared mice
Friendly leaf-eared mouse, Phyllotis amicus
Andean leaf-eared mouse, Phyllotis andium
Anita's leaf-eared mouse, Phyllotis anitae
Buenos Aires leaf-eared mouse, Phyllotis bonariensis
Capricorn leaf-eared mouse, Phyllotis caprinus
Darwin's leaf-eared mouse, Phyllotis darwini
Definitive leaf-eared mouse, Phyllotis definitus
Haggard's leaf-eared mouse, Phyllotis haggardi
Lima leaf-eared mouse, Phyllotis limatus
Master leaf-eared mouse, Phyllotis magister
Osgood's leaf-eared mouse, Phyllotis osgoodi
Bunchgrass leaf-eared mouse, Phyllotis osilae
Wolffsohn's leaf-eared mouse, Phyllotis wolffsohni
Yellow-rumped leaf-eared mouse, Phyllotis xanthopygus
Genus Punomys - puna mouse
Eastern puna mouse, Punomys kofordi
Puna mouse, Punomys lemminus
Genus Reithrodon - bunny rat
Bunny rat, Reithrodon auritus
Naked-soled conyrat, Reithrodon typicus
Genus Salinomys
Delicate salt flat mouse, Salinomys delicatus
Genus Tafimys †
Tafimys powelli
Genus Tapecomys - primordial tapecua
Primordial tapecua, Tapecomys primus
Incertae sedis
Genus Juliomys
Juliomys ossitenuis
Juliomys pictipes
Juliomys rimofrons
Genus Megaoryzomys †
Galápagos giant rat, Megaoryzomys curioi †

See also
 New World rats and mice

References

External links

 
Cricetidae
Extant Zanclean first appearances
Mammal subfamilies
Taxa named by Johann Andreas Wagner